Rachid Solh (22 June 1926 – 27 June 2014) was a Lebanese politician and former Prime Minister, kin of one of the most eminent Sunni Muslim families in the country that brought several of its members to the office of Prime Ministers, and that was originally from Sidon but later moved its civil-records to Beirut.

Career
Solh was elected to the Lebanese Parliament as an MP for the first time in Beirut in 1960 and was appointed by then President of Lebanon Suleiman Franjieh as prime minister in 1974. Solh resigned from office on 15 May 1975, a few weeks after the outbreak of the Lebanese civil war.

Following the resignation of the government of Omar Karami in May 1992, President Elias Hrawi was forced to form a new government and to hold the first parliamentary elections since the end of the civil war. The elections were boycotted en masse by the main Christian political parties who cited election fraud and corruption, and his term as Prime Minister lasted only five months. In 1996, Rachid Solh resigned from the Lebanese government and political life.

References

1926 births
2014 deaths
Rachid
Prime Ministers of Lebanon
Members of the Parliament of Lebanon
Place of birth missing
Interior ministers of Lebanon